Sclerotinia is a genus of fungi in the family Sclerotiniaceae. The widely distributed genus contains 14 species.

Taxonomy
A number of species previously assigned to Sclerotinia are now considered to be members of the closely related genus, Botrytis.

Species
Selected species include:

Sclerotinia borealis
Sclerotinia bulborum (Wakker) Sacc. 
Sclerotinia homoeocarpa F.T. Benn.  
Sclerotinia minor Jagger 
Sclerotinia ricini
Sclerotinia sclerotiorum (Lib.) de Bary 
Sclerotinia spermophila Noble 
Sclerotinia sulcata (Roberge ex Desm.) Whetzel
Sclerotinia trifoliorum Erikss.  
Sclerotinia veratri

References

Sclerotiniaceae
Helotiales genera
Taxa named by Karl Wilhelm Gottlieb Leopold Fuckel
Taxa described in 1870